The GWAS catalog is a free online database that compiles data of genome-wide association studies (GWAS), summarizing unstructured data from different literature sources into accessible high quality data. It was created by the National Human Genome Research Institute (NHGRI) in 2008 and have become a collaborative project between the NHGRI and the European Bioinformatics Institute (EBI) since 2010. As of September 2018, it has included 71,673 SNP–trait associations in 3,567 publications. 

A GWAS identifies genetic loci associated with common traits and disease through the analysis of categorized variants across the genome and the catalog provides information from all published GWAS results that meet its criteria. The catalog contains publication information, study groups information (origin, size) and SNP-disease association information (including SNP identifier, P-value, gene and risk allele). Over the years, the GWAS catalog has enhanced its data release frequency by adding features such as graphical user interface, ontology-supported search functionality and a curation interface. 

The GWAS catalog is widely used to identify causal variants and understand disease mechanisms by biologists, bioinformaticians and other researchers. Some GWAS identified common genomic loci that are associated diseases include: cardiovascular disease, inflammatory bowel disease, type 2 diabetes and breast cancer.

Accessibility of data 
The public can gain access to the GWAS Catalog’ s data in three ways:

 The NHGRI web interface’s search: provide information on traits and study publication and an tab-delimited file that is available for download.
 Interactive interface: provide a visualization of all SNP-associated traits in the GWAS catalog as well as SNPs’ positions on human chromosomes. And all SNPs are associated with a particular trait are displayed with web links to related literature from different databases.
 Ensembl, the UCSC Genome Browser, the PheGenI and other data portals provide access to the GWAS catalog through providing web links.

Applications 
Some current applications of the GWAS Catalog include the use of studies on the genetics of human diseases  and the heritability of human traits. The GWAS catalog data can also be used as a pool of markers for SNP studies.

References

External links 

Databases in the United Kingdom
Genetics databases
Genetics in the United Kingdom
Internet properties established in 2008
Online databases
Population genetics organizations
South Cambridgeshire District